Hebrew Rehabilitation Center for the Aged is a nursing home in Boston.

They facilitate medical research regarding aging, with results that have been published in the New England Journal of Medicine and covered by The New York Times. One of their departments is named Center for Social Gerontological Research.

Their research activities facilitated accreditation in 1971 by their state's Educational Facilities Authority of funding via the sale
of bonds.

References

Healthcare in Massachusetts